= Great Britain women's national inline hockey team =

National sports team

The Great Britain women's national inline hockey team is the national team for Great Britain. The team finished sixth at the 2011 Women's World Inline Hockey Championships. The team competed in the 2013 Women's World Inline Hockey Championships.
